Lehavim is an affluent town in southern Israel. Founded in 1983 and located in the northern Negev around 15 km north of Beersheba, it is a local council.

History

Lehavim, originally called "Givat Lahav," covers an area of 2,525 dunams (2.5 km²). It is one of Beersheba's three satellite towns (the others are Omer and Meitar). Most of the inhabitants commute to Beersheba for work. Lehavim is an upper-middle class community of detached homes surrounded by palm trees and gardens. As of 2017, it received the highest ranking on the Israeli Socio-Economic Index (10 out of 10)   according to the Israel Central Bureau of Statistics along with only three other municipalities (Omer, Kfar Shmaryahu and Savyon).  The town has a library, a country club, kindergartens, a school, two synagogues, and a commercial center. Lehavim achieved a municipal status in 1988.

Transportation
Lehavim is located near the intersection of Highway 40 (Beersheba–Tel Aviv) and Highway 31 (Arad–Rahat), known as the Lehavim Junction. The Lod–Beersheba railway line passes through this crossing. The Lehavim Railway Station, inaugurated in 2007 on the western side of Lehavim, and its proximity to Highway 6, have served as an economic catalyst.

Notable residents

Ron Darmon (born 1992), Olympic triathlete

References

External links
Local council website

Local councils in Southern District (Israel)
1983 establishments in Israel
Populated places established in 1983